The 2022 U-23 Baseball World Cup, officially IV U-23 Baseball World Cup, is the fourth edition of the U-23 Baseball World Cup tournament. It was held in Taipei, Taichung, and Yunlin in Taiwan. Players born between 1999 and 2004 are eligible to play the tournament.

Venues
Tianmu Baseball Stadium hosted the opening ceremony and is scheduled to host all of the Group B games and medal games. Douliu Baseball Stadium and Taichung Intercontinental Baseball Stadium were scheduled to host all of the Group A games.

Teams 
China and Nicaragua were replaced in the tournament by Puerto Rico and Colombia due to COVID-19 restrictions in those countries. The WBSC World Rankings as of the time of the competition is specified in parentheses.

Africa
  (26)

Americas

  (4)
  (6)
  (9)
  (11)
  (16)

Asia

  (1)
  (2)
  (3)

Europe

  (8)
  (18)

Oceania

  (10)

First round 
The top three teams in each pool will qualify for the second round.

Group A

H: Host
 All times are Taipei Standard Time (UTC+08:00).

|}

Group B

 All times are Taipei Standard Time (UTC+08:00).

|}

Placement round 

 All times are Taipei Standard Time (UTC+08:00).

|}

Super Round 

H: Host

 All times are Taipei Standard Time (UTC+08:00).

|}

Finals

Third-place game 

|}

Championships 

|}

Final standings

Awards

U23 All-World Team

Individual Award

See also
 List of sporting events in Taiwan

References

U-23 Baseball World Cup
U-23 World Cup
International baseball competitions hosted by Taiwan
Baseball U23 World Cup
U-23 Baseball World Cup
U-23 Baseball World Cup
Sports competitions in Taipei
21st century in Taipei
Sport in Tainan
Yunlin County